Micronesian passports are the regular travel document issued by the Federated States of Micronesia to its citizens in order to enable them to travel outside the country.

Passport cover

Micronesian passports are blue with the word "PASSPORT" written in English above the Seal of the Federated States of Micronesia emblazoned in the center, with the inscription "Federated States of Micronesia" in small gold letters beneath.

Information
The information given below is printed on the identification page.

  Type
  Photo of Passport Holder
  Passport Number 	
  Given name(s) 	
  Date of birth 	 
  Sex 
  Place of birth
  Place of Issue 	
  Date of expiry
  Surname
  Nationality
  Residence
  Date of issue
  Authority

Visa requirements

As of 1 January 2017, Micronesian citizens had visa-free or visa on arrival access to 106 countries and territories, ranking the Micronesian passport 51st in terms of travel freedom (tied with Russian passport) according to the Henley visa restrictions index.

Micronesia signed a mutual visa waiver agreement with Schengen Area countries on 20 September 2016.

United States visa
Micronesian passport holders with Form I-94 or Form I-94A, showing non-immigrant admission, can travel or enter the United States of America without any visa requirements in accordance with the Compact of Free Association between the United States and the Federated States of Micronesia.

History

Prior to the independence of the Federated States of Micronesia, Micronesians traveled internationally on documents issued by the US authorities to the citizens of the Trust Territory of the Pacific. Since October 1959, these documents were called Trust Territory Passports, and had maroon covers. They replaced earlier "Travel Documents", which were simply folded sheets of paper.

See also
Visa requirements for Micronesian citizens
Foreign relations of Federated States of Micronesia
List of passports

References 

Federated States of Micronesia